In the singles matches of the 2011 Prime Cup Aberto de São Paulo, 1st seed Ricardo Mello successfully defended his last year's title after defeating qualifier Rafael Camilo 6–2, 6–1 in the final. It was Mello's fourth overall and third consecutive win in São Paulo.

Seeds

Draw

Finals

Top half

Bottom half

References
 Main Draw
 Qualifying Draw

Prime Cup Aberto de Sao Paulo - Singles
2011 - Singles
2011 in Brazilian tennis